Ostodes can be:

 Ostodes (plant), a genus of plants
 Ostodes (gastropod), a genus of land snails